Velasquez's woodpecker (Melanerpes santacruzi) is a species of bird in subfamily Picinae of the woodpecker family Picidae. It is found from Mexico to Nicaragua.

Taxonomy and systematics

The taxonomy of Velasquez's woodpecker has not been settled. The International Ornithological Committee (IOC) treats it as a species with 11 subspecies. The American Ornithological Society, the Clements taxonomy, and BirdLife International's Handbook of the Birds of the World (HBW) treat them all as subspecies of the golden-fronted woodpecker (Melanerpes aurifrons). 

This article follows the IOC model. The 11 subspecies are:

M. s. polygrammus – (Cabanis, 1862)
M. s. grateloupensis – (Lesson, 1839)
M. s. veraecrucis – (Nelson, 1900)
M. s. dubius – (Cabot, 1844)
M. s. leei – (Ridgway, 1885)
M. s. santacruzi – (Bonaparte, 1838)
M. s. hughlandi – (Dickerman, 1987)
M. s. pauper – (Ridgway, 1888)
M. s. turneffensis – (Russell, 1963)
M. s. insulanus – (Bond, 1936)
M. s. canescens – (Salvin, 1889)

As knowledge of this species increased, the number of identified subspecies began as one, increased to four and then five, and then to the current 11. Most of the subspecies intergrade along their contact zones.

Description

In general the species has black and white barred upperparts and paler plain underparts with a colored patch on the belly. Adults have tufts of feathers at their nares that are yellow, orange, or red in different subspecies. Males have a red crown; their nape color also varies among yellow, orange, or red in different subspecies, but not always in parallel with the color of the nares. Females have a gray crown and their nape color is generally more buffy to pale yellow. The width of the black and white bars on the upperparts varies, generally from narrower in the north becoming wider in the south. The base color of the tail is black, with an amount of white on the central and outermost pairs of feathers varying from very little in the north to much more in the south. The belly patch is yellow in the north and red in the south. Almost all of the variations are clinal rather than changing abruptly from subspecies to subspecies.

Distribution and habitat

The subspecies of Velasquez's woodpecker are found thus:

M. s. polygrammus, Pacific slope of southwestern Mexico from southwestern Oaxaca to Chiapas
M. s. grateloupensis, Mexico from central San Luis Potosí and southwestern Tamaulipas to eastern Puebla and central Veracruz
M. s. veraecrucis, southern Veracruz to northeastern Guatemala.
M. s. dubius, from the Yucatán Peninsula to Belize and northeastern Guatemala
M. s. leei, Cozumel Island off the Yucatán Peninsula
M. s. santacruzi, from southeastern Chiapas through El Salvador and southwestern Honduras to north central Nicaragua
M. s. hughlandi, the upper Chixoy and Motagua rivers in central Guatemala
M. s. pauper, coastal northern Honduras
M. s. turneffensis, Turneffe Atoll off Belize
M. s. insulanus, Útila Island off Honduras
M. s. canescens, Roatán and Barbareta Islands off Honduras

Most of the studies of these taxa have concentrated on the golden-fronted woodpecker sensu stricto in Texas so little is known about the habitats frequented by most of the subspecies. M. s. polygrammus occurs in arid tropical scrublands and tropical deciduous forest.

Behavior

Movement

Velasquez's woodpecker is a year-round resident throughout its range.

Feeding
 
The few studies of Velasquez's woodpecker have determined that its diet is adult and larval arthropods, some aerial insects, and much fruit and nuts. The species forages by gleaning, pecking, probing, and least frequently by aerial flycatching.

Breeding

The breeding season of Velasquez's woodpecker varies geographically but is imperfectly known. No pattern is apparent in the height above ground of the nest cavity, which both sexes excavate. Most clutches are of four or five eggs, and both sexes incubate. The incubation period is 12 to 14 days and fledging occurs about 30 days after hatch.

Vocalization

The call of Velasquez's woodpecker is "a loud, slightly nasal, che'e'e'e" that is repeated up to three times. It "also makes a lower-pitched che-huh.

Status

The IUCN follows HBW taxonomy and so has not assessed Velasquez's woodpecker separately from the golden-fronted woodpecker sensu lato. That species is considered to be of Least Concern, with a stable population.

References

Further reading

 Skutch studied the race Melanerpes aurifrons pauper which is now Melanerpes santacruzi pauper.

Velasquez's woodpecker
Birds of Mexico
Birds of Belize
Birds of Guatemala
Birds of Honduras
Velasquez's woodpecker
Velasquez's woodpecker
Taxobox binomials not recognized by IUCN